The 2005 WGC-Accenture Match Play Championship was a golf tournament that was played from February 24–27, 2005 at La Costa Resort and Spa in Carlsbad, California. It was the seventh WGC-Accenture Match Play Championship and the first of four World Golf Championships events held in 2005.

The Championship was due to start on Wednesday February 23 but was delayed by a day because of wet conditions. The first round was played on February 24, while both the second and third rounds were played on February 25.

David Toms won his first World Golf Championships event by defeating Chris DiMarco 6 and 5 in the 36 hole final.

Brackets
The Championship was a single elimination match play event. The field consisted of the top 64 players available from the Official World Golf Rankings, seeded according to the rankings. Ernie Els, ranked number 3, chose not to play the event, so number 65 Shingo Katayama was added to the field.

Bobby Jones bracket

Ben Hogan bracket

Gary Player bracket

Sam Snead bracket

Final Four

Breakdown by country

Prize money breakdown

References

External links
Bracket

WGC Match Play
Golf in California
Carlsbad, California
Sports competitions in San Diego County, California
WGC-Accenture Match Play Championship
WGC-Accenture Match Play Championship
WGC-Accenture Match Play Championship
WGC-Accenture Match Play Championship